Persiaran Perdana or Putrajaya Boulevard is the longest boulevard in Putrajaya, Malaysia, connecting Dataran Putra in the north to the Dataran Gemilang in the south.

Putrajaya Street Circuit
This is also the location of the start-and-finish straight of the Putrajaya Street Circuit designed by British architect Simon Gibbons to be used during the second round of the 2014–15 Formula E season.

Lists of junctions 

Highways in Malaysia
Highways in Putrajaya